Cem Sultan (1459–1495) was a prince of the Ottoman Empire.

Cem or CEM may also refer to:

Colleges 
 College of Eastern Medicine, a branch of Southern California University of Health Sciences, in Los Angeles, California, US
 College of Emergency Medicine, now part of the Royal College of Emergency Medicine
 College of Engineering Munnar, an engineering college in Munnar, India
 College of Estate Management, former name of the University College of Estate Management

Organizations
 Commission of Ecosystem Management, a commission of the International Union for Conservation of Nature
 Compagnie Électro-Mécanique, a former French electrical engineering manufacturer
 Companhia de Electricidade de Macau, a private public utility company of Macau

Science and technology
 CEM cell, a cell line derived from human T cells
 Central Electronic Module, of a Volvo; for example see Volvo 480
 Chain ejection model, a model explaining electrospray ionization in mass spectrometry
 Channel electron multiplier, in a vacuum tube
 Combined Effects Munition CBU-87 Combined Effects Munition, a US cluster bomb
 Composite epoxy material, a group of composite materials
 Computational electromagnetics, modeling the interaction of electromagnetic fields with physical objects and the environment
 Contagious equine metritis, a type of metritis (uterine inflammation) in horses 
 Cylindrical Energy Module, a type of engine

Other uses
 Cem (given name), including a list of people with the given name Cem
 Cem (river), a river flowing through Albania and Montenegro
 Cem (magazine), a satirical magazine between 1910 and 1929 in Ottoman Empire and then in Turkey
 Certified Emergency Manager, a credential from the International Association of Emergency Managers
 Certified Energy Manager, a credential from the Association of Energy Engineers
 Civil Emergency Message, a warning issued through the Emergency Alert System in the US 
 Customer experience management
 Jem (Alevism) or cem, a ceremony of Alevism
 Central Airport's IATA code

See also

 CEM-I, CEM-II, CEM-III, CEM-IV, CEM-V, types of cement